Little Tavern Shops was a chain of hamburger restaurants in Baltimore, Maryland; Arlington, Virginia; Washington, D.C.; and surrounding areas.

The first Little Tavern opened March 24, 1927, in Louisville, Kentucky, by Harry F. Duncan.  The first Washington location was opened in October 1928 and the first in Baltimore opened its doors in June 1930. By 1937, there were 33 shops open. At the height of the chain, there were almost 50 locations. Duncan sold the chain in 1981. The chain had troubles in the 1990s and the last restaurant closed on April 29, 2008, although the Laurel location was re-opened that year as Laurel Tavern Donuts after being given the recipe for the burgers, which it still served as of 2022.

The original slogan of the chain was "Buy 'em by the bag", and its signs promised "Cold Drinks * Good Coffee". The stores were quite small and could accommodate only a few seated customers, while most business was take-out.

From 1928 to 1931, Little Taverns had block construction and their castle design closely resembled White Castles and White Towers of the same era. Baltimore No. 3, was the first Little Tavern to employ the "Tudor cottage" design that would become so closely associated with the chain for years to come.

Similar chains
 White Tower Hamburgers
 White Castle
 Krystal
 McDonald's in its early years

See also
 White Coffee Pot, another Baltimore-based restaurant
 List of defunct fast-food restaurant chains

External links
 Ghosts of Baltimore website
 Historical preservation of Little Tavern in Silver Spring, Maryland
 The adaptive reuse of Little Taverns

Notes

Restaurants established in 1927
Restaurants in Baltimore
Restaurants in Washington, D.C.
Regional restaurant chains in the United States
Restaurants in Louisville, Kentucky
Defunct restaurant chains in the United States
1927 establishments in Kentucky
Tudor Revival architecture in the United States
Hamburger restaurants in the United States